Alard (also Romanized as Ālārd and Alārd; also known as Alārd-e Chahār Dāng) is a village in Manjilabad Rural District of the Central District of Robat Karim County, Tehran province, Iran. At the 2006 National Census, its population was 10,619 in 2,587 households. The following census in 2011 counted 11,800 people in 3,200 households. The latest census in 2016 showed a population of 11,616 people in 3,351 households; it was the largest village in its rural district.

References 

Robat Karim County

Populated places in Tehran Province

Populated places in Robat Karim County